Idealists.cz is a social-democratic organisation founded in 2015. Although part of the social-democratic movement, it is not formally associated with the Czech Social Democratic Party.

History
Idealists were originally part of the Young Social Democrats (MSD) but became independent organisation in 2015. They were led by Radim Hejduk. Idealists seek more Progressive politics than MSD.

Idealist movement 
The Idealists movement is a Czech progressive political movement founded in June 2020. The Idealists movement continues the tradition of the Idealisté.cz association

References

External links
Official Website

Youth wings of social democratic parties
Czech Social Democratic Party
2015 establishments in the Czech Republic
Political parties established in 2015
Youth wings of political parties in the Czech Republic